Adler Apotheke or Adler Pharmacy may refer to several pharmacies in Germany:

 Adler-Apotheke (Bayreuth)
 Adler-Apotheke (Berlin-Spandau)
 Adler-Apotheke (Böckingen)
 Adler Apotheke (Dortmund)
 Adler-Apotheke (Senftenberg)
 Adler-Apotheke (Stolberg)
 Adler-Apotheke (Worms)